Greenhow is a village in North Yorkshire, England, often referred to as Greenhow Hill. The term how derives from the Old Norse word haugr meaning a hill and a mound, so Greenhow literally means 'Green's hill or mound'.

History
However, the western end of the village lying to the west of Kell Dyke, commonly known as Craven Cross, lies within the civil parish of Appletreewick in Craven.

Greenhow is an old mining village that was a major supplier of lead. Sir Stephen Proctor bought the Manor of Bewerley, including the mineral rights in 1597. He was also responsible, as part of a settlement with John Armitage over disputed land, for the founding of the actual village of Greenhow. Prior to this date the only settlement recorded on the Hill itself was Kell House, where monks of Fountains Abbey lived while guarding the abbey's lead interests.

In 1613, an agreement sought to protect the Greenhow miners' rights: "…there may be cottages erected for the miners and mineral workmen upon the said waste … and also for the keeping of draught oxen and horses for the maintenance of the mines, always leaving the tenants sufficient common".

Joseph Kipling, the grandfather of Rudyard Kipling was the minister at the Methodist Chapel at Greenhow and Rudyard himself is known to have visited the village. There is a 'Kiplings Cottage' next door to the 'Miners Arms', but it is not known whether his grandfather actually lived there.

The church in the village (St Mary's) is reputedly the highest parish church in England still in use, though services are now only fortnightly on Sunday evenings plus major feast times.

Coldstones Quarry
To the east of the village is Coldstones Quarry, operated by Hanson. The quarry is unusual in that it is located on high ground and is not easy to observe from above like most other quarries in the Yorkshire Dales. The quarry produces  of limestone aggregate per year, with most being used in West and North Yorkshire. Small amounts of fluorspar are also won from the limestone which is sent to Derbyshire for processing.  A large public artwork, The Coldstones Cut, has been created by the artist Andrew Sabin, and was opened in 2010.

Greenhow Hill
The name Greenhow Hill is also applied to a section of the B6265 road which runs between Pateley Bridge and Grassington through the village of Greenhow. The road has a very steep descent into Pateley Bridge from Greenhow (between 16 and 19%) and has been the setting for many accidents, especially for people on bicycles. This stretch of road is very popular with cyclists; it was part of the 2016 Tour de Yorkshire and is part of the Way of the Roses bike trail.

Greenhow Hill, is also the summit point between Nidderdale to the east and Wharfedale to the west.

Gallery

References

Bibliography
 Blackah, Thomas, Songs & Poems written in the Nidderdale Dialect (1867)
 Blackah, Thomas, Dialect Poems & Prose (compiled by Harald Bruff) (1937)
 Bruff, Harald J.L. T'ill an' T'oade uns upuv Greenho (1920)
 Bruff, Harald J.L. T' Miners. Character sketches of old Yorkshire Lead Miners (1924)
 Dunham, Sir Kingsley & Wilson, Albert A, Geology of the Northern Pennine Orefield, Vol 2 Stainmore to Craven (1980)

 Grainge, William, Nidderdale (1862)

 Jennings, Bernard (Ed), A History of Nidderdale (1983)
 Weatherhead, W. History of Netherdale (1839)

External links

 Greenhow Hill Website
 Greenhow Mines, brief history (Northern Mine Research Society)

Villages in North Yorkshire
Nidderdale